Elmo Live! is a toy based on the Sesame Street character Elmo.  It tells jokes, stories, sings and dances. Elmo Live is marketed by Fisher-Price.

About
Elmo Live replaced and improved upon the 2009 edition TMX Elmo toy. The new Elmo can wave his arms, move around, and cross his legs as he sits down in a chair. Elmo can be started with just a simple tickle or squeeze on his stomach, foot, back or nose. Elmo live contains interactive sensors that are capable of reactive to individual voices and touch. To make Elmo laugh the owner needs to tickle him. To make Elmo sneeze, squeeze his nose. Elmo Live can blow you kisses, it can ask for a hug, and also say that he loves you. The new advanced technology in Elmo Live creates realistic speech and a wide range of movement. Elmo can also sing his favorite songs while moving his lips with his voice. Elmo helps children from 18 months and older to develop listening skills and encourage interactions.

Requirements
6 x AA batteries are required but are included.

References

External links
 Fisher Price's Elmo Live
 Elmo Live at Amazon
 https://www.youtube.com/watch?v=dLVQBj5eV3I
 https://web.archive.org/web/20081119021736/http://www.fisher-price.com/fp.aspx?st=8001&e=product&pcat=ss_stuff&pid=44388

2000s toys
Toys based on works
Sesame Street
Fisher-Price